"Stand by You" is a song by Japanese singer songwriter Mai Kuraki, taken from her third compilation album Mai Kuraki Best 151A: Love & Hope (2014). It was released on August 27, 2014 and served as the nonfiction TV program Mai Kuraki's  the Song of Cambodia: Dreams Start from Here. It was released as a double-A side with "Muteki na Heart".

Background
The song was inspired by her experience of visiting Cambodian children through "Nantokashinakya! Project". Later Kuraki constructed a school in Cambodia in order to support native children.

Music video
A short version of the official music video was first released on Kuraki's official YouTube account on October 10, 2014. As of January 2018, it has received over 125,000 views on YouTube.

Track listing

Charts

Weekly charts

Monthly charts

Year-end charts

Certification and sales

|-
! scope="row"| Japan (RIAJ)
| 
| 29,517 
|-
|}

Release history

References

2014 singles
Mai Kuraki songs
Pop ballads
Songs written by Mai Kuraki
2014 songs
Songs with music by Akihito Tokunaga
Song recordings produced by Daiko Nagato